Highlands Farm Pit is a  geological Site of Special Scientific Interest in Henley-on-Thames in Oxfordshire. It is a Geological Conservation Review site.

The site exposes gravel from the abandoned channel of the River Thames before the Anglian ice age pushed the river south around 450,000 years ago. It may date to the late Anglian Black Park Terrace which would make it the latest known exposure of the gravel floor of the old channel, and therefore of considerable importance. It has revealed large quantities of Palaeolithic flints, which are some of the earliest of their type known. It is described by Natural England as a "crucial site".

The site is a long narrow strip of land, and there is a footpath through it from the lane to the farm.

See also
List of Sites of Special Scientific Interest in Oxfordshire

References

Further reading

Sites of Special Scientific Interest in Oxfordshire
Geological Conservation Review sites